Světlík is a municipality and village in Český Krumlov District in the South Bohemian Region of the Czech Republic. It has about 200 inhabitants.

Geography
It lies in the Bohemian Forest Foothills. The Strážný Stream springs here and flows across the municipality.

History

The first written mention of Světlík is from 1258. From 1624 to 1850, it was part of the Český Krumlov estate.

Sights
The main landmark of Světlík is the Church of Saint James the Great. It was built in the mid-13th century, its current appearance is a result of pseudo-Romanesque reconstruction in 1872–1874. The building of the rectory dates from the 18th century.

The ruins of the Pasovary Fortress are located in the northeastern part of the municipality. The fortress was founded in the 13th century. Only the torso of the masonry and the tower from the 14th century have survived.

References

External links

Villages in Český Krumlov District